Sédhiou Department is one of the 45 departments of Senegal, one of three making up the Sédhiou Region, formerly part of the Kolda Region.

The department has three communes: Diannah Malary, Marsassoum and Sédhiou

The rural districts (communautés rurales) comprise:
 Arrondissement of Diendé:
 Oudoucar
 Koussy
 Diannah Ba
 Sama Kanta Peulh
 Sakar
 Diendé
 Arrondissement of Djibabouya:
 Djibabouya
 Sansamba
 Bémet Bidjini
 Arrondissement de Djiredji
 Djiredji

Notable people born in Sédhiou 

 Association football player Sadio Mané was born in Bambali, a small town in Sédhiou.

Historic sites 
 Fortification of Fodé Kaba Doumbouya at Sédhiou
 Fort Pinet-Laprade, town of Sédhiou
 Sédhiou Prefecture

References

Departments of Senegal
Sédhiou Region